Physical is the debut studio album by English musician and Factory Floor lead vocalist Gabe Gurnsey. It was released on 3 August 2018, under Phantasy.

Release
On 11 June 2018, Gurnsey released the first single "Eyes Over". The second single "Harder Rhythm" was released on 16 July 2018.

Critical reception

Physical was met with "generally favorable" reviews from critics. At Metacritic, which assigns a weighted average rating out of 100 to reviews from mainstream publications, this release received an average score of 79, based on 9 reviews. Aggregator Album of the Year gave the release a 74 out of 100 based on a critical consensus of 8 reviews.

Accolades

Track listing

Charts

References

2018 debut albums